Korraphat Nareechan (born 7 October 1997) is a Thai professional footballer who plays as a goalkeeper for Thai League 1 club Police Tero.

International career
In 2020, He played the 2020 AFC U-23 Championship with Thailand U23.

Honours

Club
BG Pathum United
 Thailand Champions Cup (1): 2021

International
Thailand U-23
 2019 AFF U-22 Youth Championship: Runner up

External links

Korraphat Nareechan at Soccerway

1997 births
Living people
Korraphat Nareechan
Korraphat Nareechan
Association football goalkeepers
Korraphat Nareechan
Korraphat Nareechan
Korraphat Nareechan
Korraphat Nareechan
Korraphat Nareechan
Korraphat Nareechan
Competitors at the 2019 Southeast Asian Games
Korraphat Nareechan